In the Soviet Union of World War II, NKVD labor columns were militarized labor formations created from certain categories of population, both fully rightful Soviet citizens, as well as categories of limited civil rights. They were primarily from the people of ethnicities associated with the countries that fought against the Soviet Union. The vast majority of them were ethnic Germans. In later literature these formations were informally referred to as "labor army", in an analogy with Soviet Labor armies of 1920–1921, although this term was not used in official Soviet documents in reference to 1941–1946.

Although persons of these categories were not permitted to serve in the Soviet Army, members of the labor columns were considered to be conscripted for military duty.

Soviet Germans
A notable category of "labor armyists" (Russian: "трудармейцы", German: Trudarmisten) were Soviet Germans. This started in 1941, when 
the NKVD (via Prikaz 35105) banned ethnic Germans from the Soviet military. Tens of thousands of these soldiers were sent to the Labor Army.

During 1942, eventually all male Germans of ages from 16 to 50 years and all female Germans of ages 16–45 without children younger than 3 years were conscripted to labor duty. Most of them worked at "NKVD objects" (i.e., basically in the same conditions as in Gulag prison camps; the Germans were supposed to be housed in separate camps, but this was not always done), and in coal mining and petroleum industries, railroad construction, ammunition, general construction, and other industries. Many lost their lives in the labor army.

Basically the German labor columns were dismissed in 1945, but Germans were held for much longer. In 1948 they were transferred to the status of "special settlers" and were not allowed to return home. In 1955, after the official visit of Chancellor of Germany Adenauer to the Soviet Union and the signing of a number of Soviet-German agreements, this status was abolished (the process of resettlement of Germans to Germany was started at this time as well). Still, the Germans that were deported initially from European and border regions (in particular, Volga Germans) were not allowed to return.

See also
Population transfer in the Soviet Union
Reichsarbeitsdienst
Labour battalion
Unfree labour

References

GKO decree No.  1123сс “О порядке использования немцев-переселенцев призывного возраста от 17 до 50 лет” от 10 января 1942 г. 
GKO decree No. 1281сс “О мобилизации немцев-мужчин призывного возраста от 17 до 50 лет, постоянно проживающих в областях, краях, автономных и союзных республиках” от 14 февраля 1942 г 
GKO decree No. 2383 “О дополнительной мобилизации немцев для народного хозяйства СССР” от  7 октября 1942.
NKVD Order No.  0083 (January 12, 1942) “Об организации отрядов из мобилизованных немцев при лагерях НКВД СССР”.
Наталья Паэгле, ЗА КОЛЮЧЕЙ ПРОВОЛОКОЙ УРАЛА ("Beyond the Barbed Wire of Ural"), Krasnoturyinsk, 2004  (Part III: Labor Army)

External links
Labor Army (about Russian Germans)  (also English and German summaries)
"Labor Army" during the Second World War

Soviet internal politics
Forced migration in the Soviet Union
Unfree labor in the Soviet Union
Conscription in Russia
Non-combatant military personnel